The borough of Crawley, in West Sussex, England, has 45 churches, chapels and other buildings used specifically for worship. Other religious communities meet in community centres, schools and other buildings whose primary function is secular. Four other former places of worship are no longer used by their original congregation, although only two of these have fallen out of use entirely. The borough covers the New Town of Crawley, whose development began in the late 1940s, and Gatwick Airport—an international airport which has two multi-faith chapels of its own. The New Town absorbed three villages with a long history of Christian worship, and later extensions to the boundary have brought other churches into the borough.

Crawley has a majority Christian population, but it has a much larger proportion of Muslim and Hindu residents than England overall. There are two Hindu temples and a Hindu centre (Swaminarayan Manor), two Sikh gurdwaras and three mosques. A Quaker meeting house in the Ifield area is one of the oldest in the world.

Several churches have listed status in view of their architectural and historical importance, but most places of worship date from the postwar era when the New Town was developed, and are of modest architectural merit: Nikolaus Pevsner stated in 1965 that those built up to that time were "either entirely uneventful or more often mannered and contorted, with odd spikes and curvy roofs".

History and development
Most of the borough's  area is covered by Crawley New Town. The area around the villages of Three Bridges, Crawley and Ifield was selected by the British Government as the site for one of the developments proposed in the New Towns Act 1946. The Government set up a Development Corporation, headed by Sir Thomas Bennett, to coordinate the work. Anthony Minoprio designed the plans, and building work started in the late 1940s and continued until the late 1980s. The New Town consisted of self-contained neighbourhoods, each of which had at least one Anglican church. The Development Corporation's intention was for one to be placed at the centre of each neighbourhood, and for churches of other Christian denominations to occupy sites where they could serve a larger area covering several neighbourhoods. This plan was followed as far as practicable. The Corporation provided the freehold of the land on which churches were built at 25% of the price that applied for residential land use.

The old villages of Three Bridges, Crawley and Ifield lay within the ancient parishes of Crawley and Ifield. Both of their medieval parish churches are still used for Anglican worship: respectively, St John the Baptist's in Crawley town centre (much altered in the 19th century, and now surrounded by modern development) and St Margaret's Church in the old village of Ifield.  The latter was rebuilt in the 14th century and retains most of its features from that time, although some fabric is older.  Expansion of the borough's boundary has brought more churches into Crawley, including the early 11th-century church at Worth—formerly an isolated Wealden village at the centre of its own large parish.  A large, architecturally sophisticated building, it has been called "one of the most powerful Anglo-Saxon churches" in England.  Growth in the Victorian era prompted the construction of two more Anglican churches: St Michael and All Angels Church in 1867, to serve the village of Lowfield Heath (then in Surrey, and now obliterated by Gatwick Airport; the church survives and is used by Seventh-day Adventists), and St Peter's Church at West Green in Ifield parish (1892–93).  The New Town-era churches were all newly built apart from the most recent, St Mary Magdalene's Church at Bewbush—a 17th-century barn retained from a farm which was built over when the neighbourhood was laid out and converted into a church in the 1990s.

An Capuchin friary was founded in the town centre in 1860, and the opening of the friary and church the following year gave local Roman Catholics a place to worship. The site was cleared in the 1950s when the new Friary Church of St Francis and St Anthony, Crawley was built.  Additional churches were built to serve some of the neighbourhoods: Langley Green (1959), Tilgate (1962), Pound Hill (1965), Gossops Green (1971) and Broadfield (jointly used by Anglicans, Nonconformists and, from 1982, Catholics).

Ifield was a centre of Nonconformism in the 17th century: its Friends Meeting House was built in 1676, when more than 25% of the village's residents were Dissenters.  There were Congregational and Baptist chapels near Crawley High Street from 1863 and 1883 respectively, a Free church mission hall in Three Bridges from 1876 and a Brethren Gospel hall from 1916.  With the postwar growth of Crawley, other denominations became established: a Methodist church opened in 1953, Congregational churches in 1957 and 1963 (the latter replacing the 19th-century chapel),  a Latter-day Saints meetinghouse in 1964, Spiritualist churches in 1965 and 1969, Pentecostal churches in 1971 and 1981, a Gospel hall in 1957 (replacing the earlier one), Kingdom Halls for Jehovah's Witnesses in 1963 and 1983, and Baptist churches in 1954 (at West Green, replacing the Victorian chapel, and itself rebuilt in 2003), 1970 (Tilgate) and 2001 (Maidenbower).

Two mosques were established in the town in the mid-1980s, and the Ahmadiyya community founded a third in the former Elim Pentecostal church in Langley Green in 2012. A Gurjar Hindu community became established in Crawley in 1968 and opened a mandir (temple) and community centre in a building in West Green in 1998. A new temple in the Ifield area was expected to open in December 2009, but construction was delayed and it opened on 23 May 2010. There is no synagogue in Crawley, although a small Jewish community—followers of the Liberal Judaism—meet regularly. Planning permission for a synagogue had been granted in 1964, but it was never built. There is a Sikh gurdwara at Ifield and a smaller one at West Green. In January 2009 planning permission was granted for its demolition and replacement with a larger two-storey structure, but as of  no work has started.

Listed status
Historic England or its predecessor English Heritage have awarded listed status to seven church buildings in the borough. A building is defined as "listed" when it is placed on a statutory register of buildings of "special architectural or historic interest" in accordance with the Planning (Listed Buildings and Conservation Areas) Act 1990. The Department for Digital, Culture, Media and Sport, a Government department, is responsible for this; English Heritage, a non-departmental public body, acts as an agency of the department to administer the process and advise the department on relevant issues. There are three grades of listing status. Grade I, the highest, is defined as being of "exceptional interest"; Grade II* is used for "particularly important buildings of more than special interest"; and Grade II, the lowest, is used for buildings of "special interest". As of February 2001, there were three Grade I-listed buildings, 12 with Grade II* status and 80 Grade II-listed buildings in the borough of Crawley. Additionally, Crawley Borough Council grants locally listed building status to buildings which have historical or architectural interest at a local level, but which are not of sufficient quality to merit listing at a national level. As of November 2010, five churches in the borough were on the local list.

Religious affiliation
According to the 2011 United Kingdom Census, 106,597 people lived in Crawley.  Of these, 54.2% identified themselves as Christian, 7.21% were Muslim, 4.59% were Hindu, 0.68% were Sikh, 0.38% were Buddhist, 0.09% were Jewish, 0.42% followed another religion, 26.04% claimed no religious affiliation and 6.39% did not state their religion.  The proportion of Christians was lower than of England as a whole (54.2%), while affiliation with the Muslim and Hindu faiths was much higher than the national average (the corresponding national percentages were 5.02% for Islam and 1.52% for Hinduism).  The proportion of people with no religious affiliation was also higher than the national figure of 24.74%.  Affiliation with faiths in the "any other religion" category was similar to the national percentage (0.43%).  All other religions were less widespread in the borough than nationally: in England as a whole, 0.79% of people were Sikh, 0.49% were Jewish and 0.45% were Buddhist.

Administration
All Anglican churches in Crawley are part of the Diocese of Chichester, whose cathedral is at Chichester in West Sussex.  All are in the Horsham Archdeaconry, one of three archdeaconries which make up the next highest level of administration, and the Horsham Deanery – one of eight deaneries in the archdeaconry.

The Roman Catholic Diocese of Arundel and Brighton, whose cathedral is at Arundel, administers the borough's six Roman Catholic churches in Lewes district.  The diocese has 11 deaneries, each with several churches. Crawley Deanery is responsible for St Francis and St Anthony's Church in the town centre, St Bernadette at Tilgate, Our Lady Queen of Heaven at Langley Green, St Edward the Confessor at Pound Hill, St Theodore of Canterbury at Gossops Green and the Church of Christ the Lord at Broadfield, all of which are part of a single parish, as well as the churches in the nearby villages and towns of Billingshurst, East Grinstead, Henfield, Horley, Horsham, Lingfield, West Grinstead and West Hoathly and the church at Worth Abbey.

Crawley Baptist Church in West Green and Green Fields Baptist Church at Tilgate are administratively part of the Gatwick Network of the South Eastern Baptist Association.

Current places of worship

Former places of worship

Communities with no dedicated building

There are several communities in Crawley that do not worship at a building used solely for religious purposes. The non-denominational Crawley Family Church uses Waterfield Primary School, which opened in 1985 in Bewbush. Also in Bewbush, an Elim Pentecostal congregation meets weekly at Bewbush Community Primary School; regular prayer meetings, study groups and other social activities take place elsewhere in the neighbourhood. The congregation was established in May 2005. This church is associated with the Elim church in Langley Green. The Crawley Gatwick Church of Christ, an independent, non-denominational congregation formed in 1996, meets at the community centre in Gossops Green. The Salvation Army established a barracks in 1902 in West Green, but the Crawley branch is now based in Ifield: worship takes place at the neighbourhood's community centre. The Kingdom Faith church, affiliated with a group of churches based in nearby Horsham, meets at Oriel High School in the Maidenbower neighbourhood and at Roffey Place, just over the borough boundary at Faygate. Also in Maidenbower, Anglican services are held in the community centre and at the neighbourhood's infant school.  In 2006, a Pentecostalist community founded the Exodus Pentecostal Church, which worships at Tree House—Crawley's ancient manor house, now owned by the Borough Council. The weekly services cater especially for residents from Diego Garcia and Mauritius. Also in the town centre, the Potter's House Church uses the church hall of St John the Baptist's Church. It is part of the London Fellowship of Potter's House Christian Fellowship churches. The Solution Chapel International, a non-denominational church founded in January 2009 by Pastor Adama Segbedji with just 2 adults and 1 child has grown to become the largest non denominational, multi cultural church, is based at Northgate Community Centre. The Vine Christian Fellowship meets in a hotel in Southgate and holds joint services in the New Life and Green Fields Baptist churches. The Powerhouse Revival Centre meets for worship at the community centre on Ifield Drive in the Ifield neighbourhood.

Gatwick Airport
One of London's international airports, Gatwick Airport, was moved into the Borough of Crawley in 1974. A year earlier, a multi-faith chaplaincy had been established in the terminal building (now the South Terminal). The chaplaincy is coordinated by the Anglican minister, whose licence was renewed in November 2008. Roman Catholic and Free Church ministers are also on site. When the North Terminal was built, a similar chapel was provided there. Both chapels are open at all times for prayer and meditation, and offer regular services throughout the week.

See also
List of demolished places of worship in West Sussex
Listed buildings in Crawley
Locally listed buildings in Crawley

References

Notes

Bibliography

External links

Buildings and structures in Crawley
Crawley
Crawley